Bill Johnston defeated Bill Tilden in the final, 6–4, 6–4, 6–3 to win the men's singles tennis title at the 1919 U.S. National Championships. It was Johnston's second U.S. Championships singles title, after 1915.

The competition had an unseeded draw of 128 players.

Draw

Final eight

References

Men's singles
1919